The Vitebsk electoral district was a constituency created for the 1917 Russian Constituent Assembly election. The electoral district covered the Vitebsk Governorate. White Russian separatism was a negligible force in the electoral district.

On May 9–10, 1917 the 1st Latgallian Latvian Congress was held, which demanded the separation of Latgale from the Vitebsk governorate and integration with Latvia. In the Latgale region, which had an ethnic Latvian population and would later get annexed to independent Latvia, the Bolsheviks received over 50% of the votes cast. Nevertheless, Latgale had a notably weaker Bolshevik vote than neighbouring Livonia (with 72% Bolshevik vote) and the Latvian Rifles regiment (96% Bolshevik vote), possibly linked to opposition to Bolshevik policies from the Catholic Church and Jewish business sectors. The socio-economic conditions were different in Latgale than other Latvian regions, having a less educated and more religiously oriented population.

Candidatures

List 1 - Socialist-Revolutionary Party

List 2 - Trudovik Popular-Socialist Party

List 3 - Kadets

List 4 - Latgale Socialist Party of Working People

List 5 - Bolsheviks

List 6 - Bloc of the Vitebsk Belorussian People's Union and the Orthodox Parishes of the Faith of the Polotsk Diocese

List 7 - Jewish National Electoral Committee

List 8 - Vitebsk Provincial Union of Land Owners and Society of Old Believers of Vitebsk Governorate

List 9 - Mensheviks and Bund

List 10 - United Polish Organizations

List 11 - Socialists-Federalists and Peasants of Latgale 

Zigfrīds Anna Meierovics withdrew his candidature before the election, leaving 11 candidates on the list.

List 12 - Lettish Democrats-Nationalists

List 13-Peasants of Vitebsk Governorate

List 14 - Citizens of the Bolets Volost, Gorodoksky Uyezd 

Kuzminsky was member of the Left Socialist-Revolutionaries, peasant from Potashenskaya Volost, Gorodoksky Uyezd.

Results

Vitebsk town
In Vitebsk town, the Bolsheviks got 11,875 votes (34.8%), the Jewish National Electoral Committee 5,772 votes (16.9%), the Menshevik-Bund list 3,822 votes (11.3%), the White Russian/Orthodox list 3,058 votes (8.9%), the SRs 3,053 votes (8.9%), the Kadets 2,365 votes (6.9%), the Polish list 2,169 votes (6.4%), the Popular Socialists 958 votes (2.9%), the Lettish Democrats-Nationalists 395 votes (1.1%), the Landowners/Old Believers list 375 votes (1.1%), the peasants' list 197 votes (0.5%), Latgallian Socialist-Federalists 68 votes (0.2%), Latgallian nationalists 20 votes (0.1%) and 12 votes for the Boletsky volost citizens' list.

References

Electoral districts of the Russian Constituent Assembly election, 1917
Vitebsk Governorate